Robert Mason (17 December 1857 – 1 August 1927) was a British Liberal Party politician.

Family
Mason was born at Belford in Northumberland. In 1884, he married Rosa Elizabeth Thompson and they had two sons and three daughters. Their home was Marden House in Whitley Bay.

Career
Mason was a shipping agent and shipowner by profession. He was also an Alderman of Northumberland County Council and a Justice of the Peace.

Politics
Mason was selected to fight the Wansbeck constituency at a by-election on 28 May 1918 as a supporter of the Coalition government of David Lloyd George. He was opposed by Ebenezer "Ebby Edwards" for the Labour Party and won the seat by a majority of 547 votes. He stood again as a Coalition Liberal at the 1918 general election having presumably been awarded the Coalition coupon. In another straight fight against Labour he held the seat, this time with a majority of 3,399. By this time the electorate was greatly increased thanks to the Representation of the People Act of 1918.

Mason retired from the House of Commons at the 1922 election, and did not stand again.

References 

 

1857 births
1927 deaths
Liberal Party (UK) MPs for English constituencies
UK MPs 1910–1918
UK MPs 1918–1922
Councillors in Northumberland
People from Belford, Northumberland